Robert Adamson may refer to:

Robert Adamson (actor) (born 1985), American actor
Robert Stephen Adamson (1885–1965), British botanist
Robert Adamson (FDNY Commissioner) (1871–1935), American journalist and public official
Robert Adamson (philosopher) (1852–1902), Scottish philosopher
Robert Adamson (photographer) (1821–1848), Scottish chemist and pioneer in photography
Robert Adamson (poet) (1943–2022), Australian poet
Robert Adamson (software pioneer) (born 1947), American computer scientist
Robert Adamson (MP) (1753–1817), member of Parliament for Cricklade in England